"Purizumu Rain ni Tsutsuma rete" (プリズム・レインに包まれて) is the eight single by Kiyotaka Sugiyama, released by VAP on May 17, 1989. The single charted on the Oricon charts at No. 12.

The single was released only after ten months after the previous single, "Nagisa no Subete/Boys of Eternity" and was used as the song for Dai-ichi Life's "Passport 21" commercials. He appeared on the Nippon TV program The Top Ten to perform the song on June 5, 1989 with a new hairstyle.

Track listing

Charts

References 

1989 singles
1989 songs
J-pop songs